Kokanee Lake is one of over 30 alpine lakes located in British Columbia's Kokanee Glacier Provincial Park. It is fed by the Kokanee Glacier and is the headwater of Kokanee Creek. Access is possible via the Gibson Lake trailhead, from which Kokanee Lake is a  hike. Fishing is permitted and the lake is usually stocked with cutthroat trout.

Michel Trudeau avalanche accident

On November 13, 1998, Michel Trudeau, youngest son of former Canadian Prime Minister Pierre Trudeau and younger brother of Canadian Prime Minister Justin Trudeau, drowned following an avalanche accident that swept him into Kokanee Lake. Despite an extensive search his body was not recovered.   The Kokanee Glacier Cabin was built on the shore of Kaslo Lake to commemorate him and 12 others who died as a result of avalanches in the park.

See also
Kokanee (disambiguation)

References

Lakes of British Columbia
Selkirk Mountains
West Kootenay
Kootenay Land District